Harry Engholm was a British screenwriter.

Selected filmography

 East Lynne (1913)
 Sixty Years a Queen (1913)
 Lights of London (1914)
 A Study in Scarlet (1914)
 A Cinema Girl's Romance (1915)
 Dr. Wake's Patient (1916)
 The Valley of Fear (1916)
 Just a Girl (1916)
 A Fair Impostor (1916)
 Milestones (1916)
 A Pair of Spectacles (1916)
 The Sorrows of Satan (1917)
 The Duchess of Seven Dials (1920)
 The Croxley Master (1921)
 If Youth But Knew (1926)
 Every Mother's Son (1926)
 The Battles of Coronel and Falkland Islands (1927)

References

External links

Date of birth unknown
Date of death unknown
British male screenwriters